Do It Now is a 1924 American melodrama film directed by Duke Worne and produced by Phil Goldstone from a screenplay by Malcolm S. White.  The film stars William Fairbanks, Alec B. Francis, and Madge Bellamy.

Cast
 William Fairbanks
 Alec B. Francis
 Madge Bellamy
 Arthur Hoyt
 John Fox Jr.
 G. Raymond "Bill" Nye
 Dorothy Revier

References

1924 films
American silent feature films
American black-and-white films
Melodrama films
1924 drama films
Silent American drama films
Films directed by Duke Worne
1920s English-language films
1920s American films